Frogner is a village in Sørum municipality, Norway. Its population is 1,174.

References

Villages in Akershus